Norwegian Australians are Australian citizens of Norwegian ancestry. The majority of these people were part of the Norwegian diaspora.

History

An organised European immigration to Australia was initiated in 1788. Most of the early emigrants were deported from Britain to the "Penal Colony". The most famous was probably Knud Geelmuyden Bull (1811 - 1889), from Bergen, a painter and forger of coins who was deported to Hobart, Tasmania.

In 2008, 800 people celebrated the Norwegian Constitution Day in Brisbane. The 17 May celebrations in Brisbane have in recent years been considered to be the largest celebration of the Norwegian national day in the southern hemisphere.

Lund (2012) has estimated that between 1870 and 1912 approximately 2000 Norwegians immigrated to Queensland out of an estimated 6500 who came to Australia during this same period.  His study of Norwegians in Queensland, identified largely dispersed settlement patterns across the state, however there was one notable concentration - "The largest Norwegian agricultural settlement was found within a fairly limited area within 
the Darling Downs East census district, comprising flats and valleys bordered by the mountains of the Great Dividing Range. In particular, they made new homes for themselves on the rich soils surrounding the little town of Yangan; in nearby localities such as Swan Creek, Swanfels, Killarney, Emu Vale and Freestone.

The Norwegian language was generally not retained for very long by these early settlers, in most cases only a matter of a few years.  In reference to Scandinavians in Australia, Koivukangas (1986) posits that marriage to women of British heritage was a significant factor contributing to this decline and supporting widespread assimilation.

Students

Australia is one of the most popular countries for Norwegian students.

Half of the Norwegian students in Australia and New Zealand are members of ANSA — the Association of Norwegian Students Abroad.  The Norwegian Embassy in Canberra cooperates closely with ANSA Australia, and has for instance its own column in ANSA Australia's magazine "ANZA".

Notable Norwegian Australians

See also

 The Archer brothers
 Eidsvold, Queensland, after Eidsvoll, Norway
 Norwegian diaspora

References

 
 
Immigration to Australia
European Australian
Australian